Operation Madago Raya, previously known as Operation Tinombala, is a joint police–military operation conducted by the Indonesian National Police and the Indonesian Armed Forces to capture and/or eliminate members of Mujahidin Indonesia Timur (MIT), an Indonesian terrorist group which supports ISIL and was commanded by Santoso. In 2016, the Indonesian military and police succeeded in killing Santoso, but the then Chief of the National Police Tito Karnavian continued the operation to ensure the region's safety from the remaining members of the group. Central Sulawesi governor Longki Djanggola praised the operation for its relatively humane methods, since several leaders of the group were successfully captured alive. Only 19 militants were however captured alive, while more than 40 were killed.

As of October 2022, the operation is extended until December 2022, and the operation is currently undergoing phasing out phase.

Background
The operation was commenced by the Indonesian government to eradicate the MIT and prevent them from spreading terror to Indonesian and foreign citizens in Central Sulawesi. The operation, a continuation of both Operation Camar Maleo I & II, began in early March 2016 and is still ongoing. In 2014, MIT pledged their allegiance to ISIL and became a terrorist group. Their main figurehead was Santoso, though after his death and the arrests of other leaders, the remaining eleven members hid in the jungles surrounding Poso, Central Sulawesi. On 17 February 2021, the operation was renamed to Operation Madago Raya.

Timeline

On 18 July 2016, Indonesian forces shot and killed MIT leader Santoso on Operation Alpha 29. 

On 14 September 2016, Andika Eka Putra, one of the remaining members of the MIT, was killed.

On 19 September 2016, Sobron was killed by Operation Tinombala's Task Force.

On 16 May 2017, two MIT militants were killed in a firefight with Indonesian forces in Poso. One Indonesian soldier was wounded.

On 3 August 2017, a farmer was killed after he was attacked by a terrorist in Parigi Moutong Regency.

On 1 March 2021, a firefight occurred between the Indonesian Army and East Indonesia Mujahideen in the Andole Mountain area, Poso Regency, Central Sulawesi. As a result, two militants and one soldier died.

On 11 July 2021, a firefight occurred between the Indonesian Army and East Indonesia Mujahideen in the Batu Mountain area, Parigi Moutong Regency. As a result, two militants died.

On 17 July 2021, a firefight occurred between the Indonesian Army and East Indonesia Mujahideen, Parigi Moutong Regency. As a result, one militants died.

On 18 September 2021, a firefight occurred between the Indonesian Army and East Indonesia Mujahideen in Torue District, Parigi Moutong Regency. As a result, two militants died including Ali Kalora, leader of the East Indonesia Mujahideen.

On 29 September 2022, a firefight occurred between Detachment 88 and East Indonesia Mujahideen's last member in Kilo, Poso, Central Sulawesi.  As a result last member of the militant group died. Even though the last member of East Indonesia Mujahideen have been killed, Operation Madago Raya still continued, Kombes Didik Supranoto said that the operation still continued in order to keep the community safe and to avoid the formation of a similar terrorist organization again.

All casualties of members
As of May 19, 2022, the number of militants killed during the operation was of 49. Forty one of those killed were East Indonesia Mujahideen members, while six were members of the Turkistan Islamic Party and the rest coming from other parts of Indonesia. At least 19 more were arrested.
  Nae alias Galuh alias Mukhlas (from Bima) 
  Askar alias Jaid alias Pak Guru (from Bima) 
  Ali Ahmad alias Ali Kalora (from Poso) 
  Qatar alias Farel alias Anas (from Bima) 
  Jaka Ramadan alias Ikrima alias Rama (from Banten) 
  Suhardin alias Hasan Pranata (from Poso) 
  Santoso alias Abu Wardah (from Poso / Java) 
  Sabar Subagyo aka Daeng Koro 
  Basri alias Bagong (from Poso) – DT
  Jumiatun Muslim (Santoso's wife from Bima) – M
  Syarifudin Thalib alias Udin alias Usman (from Poso) – M
  Firmansyah alias Thoriq alias Imam (from Poso) – M
  Nurmi Usman (Basri's wife from Bima) – DT
  Tini Susanti Kaduka (Ali Kalora's wife from Bima) – DT
  Aditya alias Idad alias Kuasa (from Ambon) – DT
  Basir alias Romzi (from Bima) 
  Andi Muhammad alias Abdullah alias Abdurrahman Al Makasari (from Makassar) 
  Alqindi Mutaqien alias Muaz (from Banten) 
  Alhaji Kaliki alias Ibrohim (from Ambon) 
  Firdaus alias Daus aka Baroque aka Rangga (from Bima) 
  Kholid (from Poso) 
  Ali alias Darwin Gobel (from Poso) 
  Muis Fahron alias Abdullah (from Poso) 
  Rajif Gandi Sabban alias Rajes (from Ambon) 
  Suharyono Hiban aka Yono Sayur 
  Word alias Ikrima (from Poso) 
  Sucipto alias Cipto Ubaid (from Poso) 
  Adji Pandu Suwotomo alias Sobron (from Java) 
  Andika Eka Putra alias Hilal (from Poso) 
  Yazid alias Taufik (from Java) 
  Mukhtar alias Kahar (from Palu) 
  Abu Urwah aka Bado aka Osama  (from Poso)
  Mamat 
  Nanto Bojel 
  Can alias Fajar (from Bima) 
  Sogir alias Yanto (from Bima) 
  Herman alias David (from Bima) 
  Busro alias Dan (from Bima) 
  Fonda Amar Shalihin alias Dodo (from Java) 
  Hamdra Tamil alias Papa Yusran (from Poso) 
  Udin alias Rambo (from Malino) 
  Germanto alias Rudi 
  Anto alias Tiger 
  Agus Suryanto Farhan alias Ayun 
  Ibrahim (originally Uighur) 
  Bahtusan Magalazi alias Farouk (originally Uighur) 
  Nurettin Gundoggdu alias Abd Malik (originally Uighur) 
  Sadik Torulmaz alias Abdul Aziz (originally Uighur) 
  Thuram Ismali alias Joko (originally Uighur) 
  Mustafa Genc alias Mus'ab (originally Uighur) 
 Ahmet Mahmud (originally Uighur) – DT
 Altinci Bayyram (originally Uighur) – DT
 Abdul Basit Tusser (originally Uighur) – DT
 Ahmet Bozoglan (originally Uighur) – DT
  Samil alias Nunung (from Poso) – DT
  Salman alias Opik (from Bima) – M
  Jumri alias Tamar (from Poso) – M
  Ibadurahman (from Bima) – M
  Syamsul (from Java) – M
  Mochamad Sonhaji (from Java) – M
  Irfan Maulana alias Akil (from Poso) – M
  Taufik Bulaga alias Upik Lawanga (from Poso) – DT
  Azis Arifin alias Azis (from Poso) 
  Wahid alias Aan alias Bojes (from Poso) 
  Muhammad Faisal alias Namnung alias Kobar (from Poso)  
  Alvin alias Adam alias Mus'ab alias Alvin Anshori (from Banten) 
  Khairul alias Irul alias Aslam (from Poso) 
  Rukli (from Poso) 
  Ahmad Gazali alias Ahmad Panjang (from Poso) 
  Abu Alim alias Ambo (from Bima)

References

2016 in Indonesia
Madago Raya
Religion-based wars
2017 in Indonesia
2018 in Indonesia
2019 in Indonesia
2020 in Indonesia
2021 in Indonesia
Madago Raya